Margaret Bell Houston (also Margaret Bell Houston Kauffman, 1877 – June 22, 1966) was an American writer and suffragist who lived in Texas and New York. Houston published over 20 novels, most of them set in Texas. Her work was also published in Good Housekeeping and McCalls in serial format.

Early life 
Houston was born in Cedar Bayou, Texas, in 1877, to Sam Houston Jr. and his wife Lucy Anderson. Her paternal grandparents were Sam Houston and Margaret Lea Houston. She began writing at age eight. She was the sister of Dallas resident Harry Howard Houston (1883–1935).

Education 
Houston attended St. Mary's College, the American Academy of Dramatic Arts and Columbia University. She was first published in the newspapers, the Brenham Banner and the Dallas News.

Personal life 
Houston moved to Dallas and married a businessman named Kauffman. In 1913, she was the first president of the Dallas Equal Suffrage Association (DESA). Under her tenure as president of DESA, the group grew to around 200 members. She also started writing her first novel, Little Straw Wife (1914), during that time.

Houston moved to St. Petersburg, Florida, in 1953. Cottonwoods Grow Tall (1958), written after her move to Florida received "critical praise as a work of literary merit". Kirkus Reviews called it a "femininely accented story". 

Houston died in St. Petersburg on June 22, 1966. Her body was transported back to Dallas to be buried at Restland Cemetery.

Selected publications

References

Bibliography
 
 

Sam Houston
1877 births
1966 deaths
Columbia University alumni
American Academy of Dramatic Arts alumni
American women writers
American suffragists
People from St. Petersburg, Florida
People from Dallas
Writers from Florida
Writers from Texas